Dwight Bernard Taylor (born March 24, 1960) is a former professional baseball outfielder. He played during one season at the major league level for the Kansas City Royals. He was drafted by the Cleveland Indians in the 7th round of the 1981 amateur draft. Taylor, played his first professional season with their Class A Waterloo Indians in 1981, and split his last season between the Cincinnati Reds' Double-A Chattanooga Lookouts and Triple-A Nashville Sounds, in 1992.

References
"Dwight Taylor Statistics". The Baseball Cube. 10 January 2008.
"Dwight Taylor Statistics". Baseball-Reference. 10 January 2008.

External links

Baseball Gauge
Retrosheet
Mexican League
Venezuela Winter League

1960 births
Living people
American expatriate baseball players in Mexico
Arizona Wildcats baseball players
Baseball players from Los Angeles
Buffalo Bisons (minor league) players
Canton-Akron Indians players
Chattanooga Lookouts players
Colorado Springs Sky Sox players
Indianapolis Indians players
Kansas City Royals players
Leones del Caracas players
American expatriate baseball players in Venezuela
Maine Guides players
Major League Baseball outfielders
Nashville Sounds players
Omaha Royals players
Richmond Braves players
Rieleros de Aguascalientes players
Tecolotes de los Dos Laredos players
Waterloo Indians players
John C. Fremont High School alumni